Italian moths represent about 4,959 different types of moths. The moths (mostly nocturnal) and butterflies (mostly diurnal) together make up the taxonomic order Lepidoptera.

This is a list of moth species (families beginning N-P) which have been recorded in Italy, including San Marino, Sardinia, Sicily and Vatican City. Other parts of the list are at List of moths of Italy.

Nepticulidae
Acalyptris loranthella (Klimesch, 1937)
Acalyptris maritima A. & Z. Lastuvka, 1997
Acalyptris minimella (Rebel, 1924)
Acalyptris platani (Muller-Rutz, 1934)
Bohemannia pulverosella (Stainton, 1849)
Bohemannia quadrimaculella (Boheman, 1853)
Ectoedemia agrimoniae (Frey, 1858)
Ectoedemia albifasciella (Heinemann, 1871)
Ectoedemia angulifasciella (Stainton, 1849)
Ectoedemia arcuatella (Herrich-Schäffer, 1855)
Ectoedemia argyropeza (Zeller, 1839)
Ectoedemia atricollis (Stainton, 1857)
Ectoedemia caradjai (Groschke, 1944)
Ectoedemia cerris (Zimmermann, 1944)
Ectoedemia contorta van Nieukerken, 1985
Ectoedemia erythrogenella (de Joannis, 1908)
Ectoedemia gilvipennella (Klimesch, 1946)
Ectoedemia hannoverella (Glitz, 1872)
Ectoedemia haraldi (Soffner, 1942)
Ectoedemia heringella (Mariani, 1939)
Ectoedemia heringi (Toll, 1934)
Ectoedemia intimella (Zeller, 1848)
Ectoedemia klimeschi (Skala, 1933)
Ectoedemia mahalebella (Klimesch, 1936)
Ectoedemia minimella (Zetterstedt, 1839)
Ectoedemia occultella (Linnaeus, 1767)
Ectoedemia phyllotomella (Klimesch, 1946)
Ectoedemia preisseckeri (Klimesch, 1941)
Ectoedemia pubescivora (Weber, 1937)
Ectoedemia quinquella (Bedell, 1848)
Ectoedemia rubivora (Wocke, 1860)
Ectoedemia rufifrontella (Caradja, 1920)
Ectoedemia spinosella (de Joannis, 1908)
Ectoedemia subbimaculella (Haworth, 1828)
Ectoedemia suberis (Stainton, 1869)
Ectoedemia turbidella (Zeller, 1848)
Ectoedemia albibimaculella (Larsen, 1927)
Ectoedemia louisella (Sircom, 1849)
Ectoedemia obtusa (Puplesis & Diskus, 1996)
Ectoedemia sericopeza (Zeller, 1839)
Ectoedemia euphorbiella (Stainton, 1869)
Ectoedemia groschkei (Skala, 1943)
Ectoedemia septembrella (Stainton, 1849)
Ectoedemia vincamajorella (Hartig, 1964)
Ectoedemia viridissimella (Caradja, 1920)
Ectoedemia weaveri (Stainton, 1855)
Ectoedemia amani Svensson, 1966
Ectoedemia atrifrontella (Stainton, 1851)
Ectoedemia liebwerdella Zimmermann, 1940
Ectoedemia liguricella Klimesch, 1953
Ectoedemia longicaudella Klimesch, 1953
Ectoedemia reichli Z. & A. Lastuvka, 1998
Parafomoria helianthemella (Herrich-Schäffer, 1860)
Parafomoria liguricella (Klimesch, 1946)
Parafomoria pseudocistivora van Nieukerken, 1983
Simplimorpha promissa (Staudinger, 1871)
Stigmella aceris (Frey, 1857)
Stigmella aeneofasciella (Herrich-Schäffer, 1855)
Stigmella alaternella (Le Marchand, 1937)
Stigmella alnetella (Stainton, 1856)
Stigmella anomalella (Goeze, 1783)
Stigmella assimilella (Zeller, 1848)
Stigmella atricapitella (Haworth, 1828)
Stigmella aurella (Fabricius, 1775)
Stigmella basiguttella (Heinemann, 1862)
Stigmella betulicola (Stainton, 1856)
Stigmella carpinella (Heinemann, 1862)
Stigmella catharticella (Stainton, 1853)
Stigmella centifoliella (Zeller, 1848)
Stigmella confusella (Wood & Walsingham, 1894)
Stigmella crataegella (Klimesch, 1936)
Stigmella desperatella (Frey, 1856)
Stigmella dorsiguttella (Johansson, 1971)
Stigmella dryadella (O. Hofmann, 1868)
Stigmella eberhardi (Johansson, 1971)
Stigmella floslactella (Haworth, 1828)
Stigmella freyella (Heyden, 1858)
Stigmella glutinosae (Stainton, 1858)
Stigmella hahniella (Worz, 1937)
Stigmella hemargyrella (Kollar, 1832)
Stigmella hybnerella (Hübner, 1796)
Stigmella incognitella (Herrich-Schäffer, 1855)
Stigmella irregularis Puplesis, 1994
Stigmella johanssonella A. & Z. Lastuvka, 1997
Stigmella lapponica (Wocke, 1862)
Stigmella lemniscella (Zeller, 1839)
Stigmella lonicerarum (Frey, 1856)
Stigmella luteella (Stainton, 1857)
Stigmella magdalenae (Klimesch, 1950)
Stigmella malella (Stainton, 1854)
Stigmella mespilicola (Frey, 1856)
Stigmella microtheriella (Stainton, 1854)
Stigmella minusculella (Herrich-Schäffer, 1855)
Stigmella myrtillella (Stainton, 1857)
Stigmella naturnella (Klimesch, 1936)
Stigmella nivenburgensis (Preissecker, 1942)
Stigmella nylandriella (Tengstrom, 1848)
Stigmella obliquella (Heinemann, 1862)
Stigmella oxyacanthella (Stainton, 1854)
Stigmella paliurella Gerasimov, 1937
Stigmella pallidiciliella Klimesch, 1946
Stigmella paradoxa (Frey, 1858)
Stigmella perpygmaeella (Doubleday, 1859)
Stigmella plagicolella (Stainton, 1854)
Stigmella poterii (Stainton, 1857)
Stigmella prunetorum (Stainton, 1855)
Stigmella pyri (Glitz, 1865)
Stigmella regiella (Herrich-Schäffer, 1855)
Stigmella rhamnella (Herrich-Schäffer, 1860)
Stigmella rhamnophila (Amsel, 1934)
Stigmella roborella (Johansson, 1971)
Stigmella rolandi van Nieukerken, 1990
Stigmella ruficapitella (Haworth, 1828)
Stigmella sakhalinella Puplesis, 1984
Stigmella salicis (Stainton, 1854)
Stigmella samiatella (Zeller, 1839)
Stigmella sorbi (Stainton, 1861)
Stigmella speciosa (Frey, 1858)
Stigmella splendidissimella (Herrich-Schäffer, 1855)
Stigmella stelviana (Weber, 1938)
Stigmella suberivora (Stainton, 1869)
Stigmella svenssoni (Johansson, 1971)
Stigmella szoecsiella (Borkowski, 1972)
Stigmella thuringiaca (Petry, 1904)
Stigmella tiliae (Frey, 1856)
Stigmella tityrella (Stainton, 1854)
Stigmella tormentillella (Herrich-Schäffer, 1860)
Stigmella trimaculella (Haworth, 1828)
Stigmella ulmivora (Fologne, 1860)
Stigmella vimineticola (Frey, 1856)
Stigmella viscerella (Stainton, 1853)
Stigmella zangherii (Klimesch, 1951)
Trifurcula headleyella (Stainton, 1854)
Trifurcula istriae A. & Z. Lastuvka, 2000
Trifurcula melanoptera van Nieukerken & Puplesis, 1991
Trifurcula montana Z. Lastuvka, A. Lastuvka & Van Nieukerken, 2007
Trifurcula rosmarinella (Chretien, 1914)
Trifurcula saturejae (Parenti, 1963)
Trifurcula stoechadella Klimesch, 1975
Trifurcula cryptella (Stainton, 1856)
Trifurcula eurema (Tutt, 1899)
Trifurcula ortneri (Klimesch, 1951)
Trifurcula aurella Rebel, 1933
Trifurcula austriaca van Nieukerken, 1990
Trifurcula baldensis A. & Z. Lastuvka, 2005
Trifurcula calycotomella A. & Z. Lastuvka, 1997
Trifurcula cytisanthi A. & Z. Lastuvka, 2005
Trifurcula etnensis A. & Z. Lastuvka, 2005
Trifurcula immundella (Zeller, 1839)
Trifurcula josefklimeschi van Nieukerken, 1990
Trifurcula moravica Z. & A. Lastuvka, 1994
Trifurcula orientella Klimesch, 1953
Trifurcula pallidella (Duponchel, 1843)
Trifurcula silviae van Nieukerken, 1990
Trifurcula subnitidella (Duponchel, 1843)
Trifurcula trasaghica A. & Z. Lastuvka, 2005

Noctuidae
Abrostola agnorista Dufay, 1956
Abrostola asclepiadis (Denis & Schiffermuller, 1775)
Abrostola tripartita (Hufnagel, 1766)
Abrostola triplasia (Linnaeus, 1758)
Acontia lucida (Hufnagel, 1766)
Acontia trabealis (Scopoli, 1763)
Acontiola moldavicola (Herrich-Schäffer, 1851)
Acosmetia caliginosa (Hübner, 1813)
Acronicta aceris (Linnaeus, 1758)
Acronicta leporina (Linnaeus, 1758)
Acronicta strigosa (Denis & Schiffermuller, 1775)
Acronicta alni (Linnaeus, 1767)
Acronicta cuspis (Hübner, 1813)
Acronicta psi (Linnaeus, 1758)
Acronicta tridens (Denis & Schiffermuller, 1775)
Acronicta auricoma (Denis & Schiffermuller, 1775)
Acronicta euphorbiae (Denis & Schiffermuller, 1775)
Acronicta menyanthidis (Esper, 1789)
Acronicta rumicis (Linnaeus, 1758)
Actebia praecox (Linnaeus, 1758)
Actebia multifida (Lederer, 1870)
Actinotia polyodon (Clerck, 1759)
Actinotia radiosa (Esper, 1804)
Aedia funesta (Esper, 1786)
Aedia leucomelas (Linnaeus, 1758)
Aegle agatha (Staudinger, 1861)
Aegle kaekeritziana (Hübner, 1799)
Aegle semicana (Esper, 1798)
Agrochola lychnidis (Denis & Schiffermuller, 1775)
Agrochola helvola (Linnaeus, 1758)
Agrochola humilis (Denis & Schiffermuller, 1775)
Agrochola kindermannii (Fischer v. Röslerstamm, 1837)
Agrochola litura (Linnaeus, 1758)
Agrochola lunosa (Haworth, 1809)
Agrochola meridionalis (Staudinger, 1871)
Agrochola orejoni Agenjo, 1951
Agrochola pistacinoides (d'Aubuisson, 1867)
Agrochola prolai Berio, 1976
Agrochola haematidea (Duponchel, 1827)
Agrochola blidaensis (Stertz, 1915)
Agrochola lota (Clerck, 1759)
Agrochola macilenta (Hübner, 1809)
Agrochola laevis (Hübner, 1803)
Agrochola circellaris (Hufnagel, 1766)
Agrotis bigramma (Esper, 1790)
Agrotis catalaunensis (Milliere, 1873)
Agrotis cinerea (Denis & Schiffermuller, 1775)
Agrotis clavis (Hufnagel, 1766)
Agrotis endogaea Boisduval, 1834
Agrotis exclamationis (Linnaeus, 1758)
Agrotis fatidica (Hübner, 1824)
Agrotis ipsilon (Hufnagel, 1766)
Agrotis lata Treitschke, 1835
Agrotis obesa Boisduval, 1829
Agrotis proverai Zilli, Fibiger, Ronkay & Yela, 2010
Agrotis puta (Hübner, 1803)
Agrotis schawerdai Bytinski-Salz, 1937
Agrotis segetum (Denis & Schiffermuller, 1775)
Agrotis simplonia (Geyer, 1832)
Agrotis spinifera (Hübner, 1808)
Agrotis trux (Hübner, 1824)
Agrotis turatii Standfuss, 1888
Agrotis vestigialis (Hufnagel, 1766)
Allophyes corsica (Spuler, 1905)
Allophyes oxyacanthae (Linnaeus, 1758)
Alvaradoia numerica (Boisduval, 1840)
Amephana anarrhini (Duponchel, 1840)
Amephana aurita (Fabricius, 1787)
Ammoconia caecimacula (Denis & Schiffermuller, 1775)
Ammoconia senex (Geyer, 1828)
Ammopolia witzenmanni (Standfuss, 1890)
Amphipoea fucosa (Freyer, 1830)
Amphipoea oculea (Linnaeus, 1761)
Amphipyra berbera Rungs, 1949
Amphipyra effusa Boisduval, 1828
Amphipyra livida (Denis & Schiffermuller, 1775)
Amphipyra perflua (Fabricius, 1787)
Amphipyra pyramidea (Linnaeus, 1758)
Amphipyra tetra (Fabricius, 1787)
Amphipyra tragopoginis (Clerck, 1759)
Amphipyra cinnamomea (Goeze, 1781)
Anaplectoides prasina (Denis & Schiffermuller, 1775)
Anarta myrtilli (Linnaeus, 1761)
Anarta dianthi (Tauscher, 1809)
Anarta melanopa (Thunberg, 1791)
Anarta odontites (Boisduval, 1829)
Anarta pugnax (Hübner, 1824)
Anarta sodae (Rambur, 1829)
Anarta stigmosa (Christoph, 1887)
Anarta trifolii (Hufnagel, 1766)
Anorthoa munda (Denis & Schiffermuller, 1775)
Anthracia ephialtes (Hübner, 1822)
Antitype chi (Linnaeus, 1758)
Antitype jonis (Lederer, 1865)
Antitype suda (Geyer, 1832)
Apamea anceps (Denis & Schiffermuller, 1775)
Apamea aquila Donzel, 1837
Apamea arabs Oberthur, 1881
Apamea crenata (Hufnagel, 1766)
Apamea epomidion (Haworth, 1809)
Apamea furva (Denis & Schiffermuller, 1775)
Apamea illyria Freyer, 1846
Apamea lateritia (Hufnagel, 1766)
Apamea lithoxylaea (Denis & Schiffermuller, 1775)
Apamea maillardi (Geyer, 1834)
Apamea monoglypha (Hufnagel, 1766)
Apamea oblonga (Haworth, 1809)
Apamea platinea (Treitschke, 1825)
Apamea remissa (Hübner, 1809)
Apamea rubrirena (Treitschke, 1825)
Apamea scolopacina (Esper, 1788)
Apamea sicula (Turati, 1909)
Apamea sordens (Hufnagel, 1766)
Apamea sublustris (Esper, 1788)
Apamea syriaca (Osthelder, 1933)
Apamea unanimis (Hübner, 1813)
Apamea zeta (Treitschke, 1825)
Aporophyla australis (Boisduval, 1829)
Aporophyla canescens (Duponchel, 1826)
Aporophyla chioleuca (Herrich-Schäffer, 1850)
Aporophyla lueneburgensis (Freyer, 1848)
Aporophyla nigra (Haworth, 1809)
Apterogenum ypsillon (Denis & Schiffermuller, 1775)
Archanara dissoluta (Treitschke, 1825)
Archanara neurica (Hübner, 1808)
Arenostola phragmitidis (Hübner, 1803)
Asteroscopus sphinx (Hufnagel, 1766)
Atethmia ambusta (Denis & Schiffermuller, 1775)
Atethmia centrago (Haworth, 1809)
Athetis furvula (Hübner, 1808)
Athetis gluteosa (Treitschke, 1835)
Athetis pallustris (Hübner, 1808)
Athetis hospes (Freyer, 1831)
Atypha pulmonaris (Esper, 1790)
Auchmis detersa (Esper, 1787)
Autographa aemula (Denis & Schiffermuller, 1775)
Autographa bractea (Denis & Schiffermuller, 1775)
Autographa gamma (Linnaeus, 1758)
Autographa jota (Linnaeus, 1758)
Autographa pulchrina (Haworth, 1809)
Axylia putris (Linnaeus, 1761)
Brachionycha nubeculosa (Esper, 1785)
Brachylomia viminalis (Fabricius, 1776)
Brithys crini (Fabricius, 1775)
Bryonycta pineti (Staudinger, 1859)
Bryophila amoenissima Turati, 1909
Bryophila ereptricula Treitschke, 1825
Bryophila felina (Eversmann, 1852)
Bryophila galathea Milliere, 1875
Bryophila raptricula (Denis & Schiffermuller, 1775)
Bryophila ravula (Hübner, 1813)
Bryophila vandalusiae Duponchel, 1842
Bryophila domestica (Hufnagel, 1766)
Calamia tridens (Hufnagel, 1766)
Calliergis ramosa (Esper, 1786)
Callopistria juventina (Stoll, 1782)
Callopistria latreillei (Duponchel, 1827)
Calophasia almoravida Graslin, 1863
Calophasia lunula (Hufnagel, 1766)
Calophasia opalina (Esper, 1793)
Calophasia platyptera (Esper, 1788)
Caradrina germainii (Duponchel, 1835)
Caradrina morpheus (Hufnagel, 1766)
Caradrina gilva (Donzel, 1837)
Caradrina vicina Staudinger, 1870
Caradrina ingrata Staudinger, 1897
Caradrina abruzzensis (Draudt, 1933)
Caradrina clavipalpis Scopoli, 1763
Caradrina flavirena Guenee, 1852
Caradrina fuscicornis Rambur, 1832
Caradrina noctivaga Bellier, 1863
Caradrina selini Boisduval, 1840
Caradrina suscianja (Mentzer, 1981)
Caradrina wullschlegeli Pungeler, 1903
Caradrina aspersa Rambur, 1834
Caradrina kadenii Freyer, 1836
Caradrina montana Bremer, 1861
Caradrina proxima Rambur, 1837
Caradrina terrea Freyer, 1840
Cardepia affinis (Rothschild, 1913)
Cardepia hartigi Parenzan, 1981
Cardepia sociabilis (de Graslin, 1850)
Ceramica pisi (Linnaeus, 1758)
Cerapteryx graminis (Linnaeus, 1758)
Cerastis faceta (Treitschke, 1835)
Cerastis leucographa (Denis & Schiffermuller, 1775)
Cerastis rubricosa (Denis & Schiffermuller, 1775)
Charanyca trigrammica (Hufnagel, 1766)
Charanyca apfelbecki (Rebel, 1901)
Charanyca ferruginea (Esper, 1785)
Chersotis alpestris (Boisduval, 1837)
Chersotis anatolica (Draudt, 1936)
Chersotis andereggii (Boisduval, 1832)
Chersotis cuprea (Denis & Schiffermuller, 1775)
Chersotis cyrnea (Spuler, 1908)
Chersotis elegans (Eversmann, 1837)
Chersotis fimbriola (Esper, 1803)
Chersotis larixia (Guenee, 1852)
Chersotis margaritacea (Villers, 1789)
Chersotis multangula (Hübner, 1803)
Chersotis ocellina (Denis & Schiffermuller, 1775)
Chersotis oreina Dufay, 1984
Chersotis rectangula (Denis & Schiffermuller, 1775)
Chilodes maritima (Tauscher, 1806)
Chloantha hyperici (Denis & Schiffermuller, 1775)
Chrysodeixis chalcites (Esper, 1789)
Clemathada calberlai (Staudinger, 1883)
Cleoceris scoriacea (Esper, 1789)
Cleonymia baetica (Rambur, 1837)
Cleonymia yvanii (Duponchel, 1833)
Coenobia rufa (Haworth, 1809)
Coenophila subrosea (Stephens, 1829)
Colocasia coryli (Linnaeus, 1758)
Condica viscosa (Freyer, 1831)
Conisania poelli Stertz, 1915
Conisania renati (Oberthur, 1890)
Conisania luteago (Denis & Schiffermuller, 1775)
Conistra iana Zilli & Grassi, 2006
Conistra intricata (Boisduval, 1829)
Conistra ligula (Esper, 1791)
Conistra rubiginosa (Scopoli, 1763)
Conistra vaccinii (Linnaeus, 1761)
Conistra veronicae (Hübner, 1813)
Conistra erythrocephala (Denis & Schiffermuller, 1775)
Conistra rubiginea (Denis & Schiffermuller, 1775)
Conistra staudingeri (Graslin, 1863)
Conistra ragusae (Failla-Tedaldi, 1890)
Conistra torrida (Lederer, 1857)
Coranarta cordigera (Thunberg, 1788)
Cornutiplusia circumflexa (Linnaeus, 1767)
Cosmia trapezina (Linnaeus, 1758)
Cosmia diffinis (Linnaeus, 1767)
Cosmia pyralina (Denis & Schiffermuller, 1775)
Cosmia confinis Herrich-Schäffer, 1849
Cosmia affinis (Linnaeus, 1767)
Craniophora ligustri (Denis & Schiffermuller, 1775)
Craniophora pontica (Staudinger, 1878)
Cryphia fraudatricula (Hübner, 1803)
Cryphia receptricula (Hübner, 1803)
Cryphia simulatricula (Guenee, 1852)
Cryphia algae (Fabricius, 1775)
Cryphia ochsi (Boursin, 1940)
Cryphia pallida (Baker, 1894)
Crypsedra gemmea (Treitschke, 1825)
Ctenoplusia accentifera (Lefebvre, 1827)
Cucullia absinthii (Linnaeus, 1761)
Cucullia argentea (Hufnagel, 1766)
Cucullia artemisiae (Hufnagel, 1766)
Cucullia asteris (Denis & Schiffermuller, 1775)
Cucullia calendulae Treitschke, 1835
Cucullia campanulae Freyer, 1831
Cucullia cemenelensis Boursin, 1923
Cucullia chamomillae (Denis & Schiffermuller, 1775)
Cucullia cineracea Freyer, 1841
Cucullia dracunculi (Hübner, 1813)
Cucullia formosa Rogenhofer, 1860
Cucullia gnaphalii (Hübner, 1813)
Cucullia hartigi G. Ronkay & L. Ronkay, 1988
Cucullia lactucae (Denis & Schiffermuller, 1775)
Cucullia lucifuga (Denis & Schiffermuller, 1775)
Cucullia santolinae Rambur, 1834
Cucullia santonici (Hübner, 1813)
Cucullia tanaceti (Denis & Schiffermuller, 1775)
Cucullia umbratica (Linnaeus, 1758)
Cucullia xeranthemi Boisduval, 1840
Cucullia blattariae (Esper, 1790)
Cucullia caninae Rambur, 1833
Cucullia lanceolata (Villers, 1789)
Cucullia lychnitis Rambur, 1833
Cucullia prenanthis Boisduval, 1840
Cucullia scrophulariae (Denis & Schiffermuller, 1775)
Cucullia scrophulariphaga Rambur, 1833
Cucullia verbasci (Linnaeus, 1758)
Dasypolia ferdinandi Ruhl, 1892
Dasypolia templi (Thunberg, 1792)
Deltote bankiana (Fabricius, 1775)
Deltote deceptoria (Scopoli, 1763)
Deltote uncula (Clerck, 1759)
Deltote pygarga (Hufnagel, 1766)
Denticucullus mabillei (D. Lucas, 1907)
Denticucullus pygmina (Haworth, 1809)
Diachrysia chrysitis (Linnaeus, 1758)
Diachrysia chryson (Esper, 1789)
Diachrysia nadeja (Oberthur, 1880)
Diachrysia stenochrysis (Warren, 1913)
Diachrysia zosimi (Hübner, 1822)
Diarsia brunnea (Denis & Schiffermuller, 1775)
Diarsia dahlii (Hübner, 1813)
Diarsia florida (F. Schmidt, 1859)
Diarsia mendica (Fabricius, 1775)
Diarsia rubi (Vieweg, 1790)
Dichagyris flammatra (Denis & Schiffermuller, 1775)
Dichagyris musiva (Hübner, 1803)
Dichagyris candelisequa (Denis & Schiffermuller, 1775)
Dichagyris celsicola (Bellier, 1859)
Dichagyris constanti (Milliere, 1860)
Dichagyris fidelis (de Joannis, 1903)
Dichagyris forcipula (Denis & Schiffermuller, 1775)
Dichagyris nigrescens (Hofner, 1888)
Dichagyris renigera (Hübner, 1808)
Dichagyris signifera (Denis & Schiffermuller, 1775)
Dichagyris vallesiaca (Boisduval, 1837)
Dichonia aeruginea (Hübner, 1808)
Dichonia convergens (Denis & Schiffermuller, 1775)
Dicycla oo (Linnaeus, 1758)
Diloba caeruleocephala (Linnaeus, 1758)
Dryobota labecula (Esper, 1788)
Dryobotodes tenebrosa (Esper, 1789)
Dryobotodes carbonis Wagner, 1931
Dryobotodes eremita (Fabricius, 1775)
Dryobotodes monochroma (Esper, 1790)
Dryobotodes servadeii Parenzan, 1982
Dypterygia scabriuscula (Linnaeus, 1758)
Egira anatolica (M. Hering, 1933)
Egira conspicillaris (Linnaeus, 1758)
Elaphria venustula (Hübner, 1790)
Enargia abluta (Hübner, 1808)
Enargia paleacea (Esper, 1788)
Enterpia laudeti (Boisduval, 1840)
Epilecta linogrisea (Denis & Schiffermuller, 1775)
Epimecia ustula (Freyer, 1835)
Epipsilia cervantes (Reisser, 1935)
Epipsilia grisescens (Fabricius, 1794)
Epipsilia latens (Hübner, 1809)
Episema glaucina (Esper, 1789)
Episema grueneri Boisduval, 1837
Episema tersa (Denis & Schiffermuller, 1775)
Eremobia ochroleuca (Denis & Schiffermuller, 1775)
Eremohadena chenopodiphaga (Rambur, 1832)
Eremohadena halimi (Milliere, 1877)
Eucarta amethystina (Hübner, 1803)
Eucarta virgo (Treitschke, 1835)
Euchalcia bellieri (Kirby, 1900)
Euchalcia italica (Staudinger, 1882)
Euchalcia modestoides Poole, 1989
Euchalcia variabilis (Piller, 1783)
Eucoptocnemis optabilis (Boisduval, 1834)
Eugnorisma glareosa (Esper, 1788)
Eugnorisma depuncta (Linnaeus, 1761)
Eugraphe sigma (Denis & Schiffermuller, 1775)
Euplexia lucipara (Linnaeus, 1758)
Eupsilia transversa (Hufnagel, 1766)
Eurois occulta (Linnaeus, 1758)
Euxoa aquilina (Denis & Schiffermuller, 1775)
Euxoa birivia (Denis & Schiffermuller, 1775)
Euxoa conspicua (Hübner, 1824)
Euxoa cos (Hübner, 1824)
Euxoa culminicola (Staudinger, 1870)
Euxoa decora (Denis & Schiffermuller, 1775)
Euxoa distinguenda (Lederer, 1857)
Euxoa eruta (Hübner, 1817)
Euxoa hastifera (Donzel, 1847)
Euxoa nigricans (Linnaeus, 1761)
Euxoa nigrofusca (Esper, 1788)
Euxoa obelisca (Denis & Schiffermuller, 1775)
Euxoa recussa (Hübner, 1817)
Euxoa segnilis (Duponchel, 1837)
Euxoa temera (Hübner, 1808)
Euxoa tritici (Linnaeus, 1761)
Euxoa vitta (Esper, 1789)
Evisa schawerdae Reisser, 1930
Fabula zollikoferi (Freyer, 1836)
Globia algae (Esper, 1789)
Globia sparganii (Esper, 1790)
Gortyna borelii Pierret, 1837
Gortyna flavago (Denis & Schiffermuller, 1775)
Gortyna franciscae (Turati, 1913)
Gortyna puengeleri (Turati, 1909)
Gortyna xanthenes Germar, 1842
Graphiphora augur (Fabricius, 1775)
Griposia aprilina (Linnaeus, 1758)
Griposia skyvai Dvorak & Sumpich, 2010
Hada plebeja (Linnaeus, 1761)
Hadena irregularis (Hufnagel, 1766)
Hadena perplexa (Denis & Schiffermuller, 1775)
Hadena sancta (Staudinger, 1859)
Hadena silenes (Hübner, 1822)
Hadena adriana (Schawerda, 1921)
Hadena albimacula (Borkhausen, 1792)
Hadena bicruris (Hufnagel, 1766)
Hadena caesia (Denis & Schiffermuller, 1775)
Hadena clara (Staudinger, 1901)
Hadena compta (Denis & Schiffermuller, 1775)
Hadena confusa (Hufnagel, 1766)
Hadena filograna (Esper, 1788)
Hadena gueneei (Staudinger, 1901)
Hadena luteocincta (Rambur, 1834)
Hadena magnolii (Boisduval, 1829)
Hadena vulcanica (Turati, 1907)
Hadena tephroleuca (Boisduval, 1833)
Haemerosia renalis (Hübner, 1813)
Hecatera bicolorata (Hufnagel, 1766)
Hecatera cappa (Hübner, 1809)
Hecatera corsica (Rambur, 1832)
Hecatera dysodea (Denis & Schiffermuller, 1775)
Hecatera weissi (Draudt, 1934)
Helicoverpa armigera (Hübner, 1808)
Heliothis incarnata Freyer, 1838
Heliothis maritima Graslin, 1855
Heliothis nubigera Herrich-Schäffer, 1851
Heliothis ononis (Denis & Schiffermuller, 1775)
Heliothis peltigera (Denis & Schiffermuller, 1775)
Heliothis viriplaca (Hufnagel, 1766)
Helotropha leucostigma (Hübner, 1808)
Hoplodrina ambigua (Denis & Schiffermuller, 1775)
Hoplodrina blanda (Denis & Schiffermuller, 1775)
Hoplodrina octogenaria (Goeze, 1781)
Hoplodrina respersa (Denis & Schiffermuller, 1775)
Hoplodrina superstes (Ochsenheimer, 1816)
Hydraecia micacea (Esper, 1789)
Hydraecia osseola Staudinger, 1882
Hydraecia petasitis Doubleday, 1847
Hyppa rectilinea (Esper, 1788)
Hyssia cavernosa (Eversmann, 1842)
Ipimorpha retusa (Linnaeus, 1761)
Ipimorpha subtusa (Denis & Schiffermuller, 1775)
Jodia croceago (Denis & Schiffermuller, 1775)
Lacanobia contigua (Denis & Schiffermuller, 1775)
Lacanobia suasa (Denis & Schiffermuller, 1775)
Lacanobia thalassina (Hufnagel, 1766)
Lacanobia aliena (Hübner, 1809)
Lacanobia blenna (Hübner, 1824)
Lacanobia oleracea (Linnaeus, 1758)
Lacanobia splendens (Hübner, 1808)
Lacanobia w-latinum (Hufnagel, 1766)
Lamprosticta culta (Denis & Schiffermuller, 1775)
Lamprotes c-aureum (Knoch, 1781)
Lasionycta imbecilla (Fabricius, 1794)
Lasionycta proxima (Hübner, 1809)
Lateroligia ophiogramma (Esper, 1794)
Lenisa geminipuncta (Haworth, 1809)
Leucania loreyi (Duponchel, 1827)
Leucania comma (Linnaeus, 1761)
Leucania joannisi Boursin & Rungs, 1952
Leucania obsoleta (Hübner, 1803)
Leucania punctosa (Treitschke, 1825)
Leucania putrescens (Hübner, 1824)
Leucania zeae (Duponchel, 1827)
Leucochlaena oditis (Hübner, 1822)
Leucochlaena seposita Turati, 1921
Leucochlaena turatii (Schawerda, 1931)
Lithophane consocia (Borkhausen, 1792)
Lithophane furcifera (Hufnagel, 1766)
Lithophane merckii (Rambur, 1832)
Lithophane ornitopus (Hufnagel, 1766)
Lithophane semibrunnea (Haworth, 1809)
Lithophane socia (Hufnagel, 1766)
Lithophane lapidea (Hübner, 1808)
Lithophane leautieri (Boisduval, 1829)
Litoligia literosa (Haworth, 1809)
Luperina dumerilii (Duponchel, 1826)
Luperina kruegeri Turati, 1912
Luperina nickerlii (Freyer, 1845)
Luperina rubella (Duponchel, 1835)
Luperina samnii (Sohn-Rethel, 1929)
Luperina siegeli Berio, 1986
Luperina testacea (Denis & Schiffermuller, 1775)
Luperina tiberina (Sohn-Rethel, 1929)
Lycophotia erythrina (Herrich-Schäffer, 1852)
Lycophotia porphyrea (Denis & Schiffermuller, 1775)
Macdunnoughia confusa (Stephens, 1850)
Mamestra brassicae (Linnaeus, 1758)
Meganephria bimaculosa (Linnaeus, 1767)
Melanchra persicariae (Linnaeus, 1761)
Mesapamea remmi Rezbanyai-Reser, 1985
Mesapamea secalella Remm, 1983
Mesapamea secalis (Linnaeus, 1758)
Mesogona acetosellae (Denis & Schiffermuller, 1775)
Mesogona oxalina (Hübner, 1803)
Mesoligia furuncula (Denis & Schiffermuller, 1775)
Metopoceras omar (Oberthur, 1887)
Metopoceras khalildja Oberthur, 1884
Mniotype adusta (Esper, 1790)
Mniotype anilis (Boisduval, 1840)
Mniotype satura (Denis & Schiffermuller, 1775)
Mniotype solieri (Boisduval, 1829)
Mniotype spinosa (Chretien, 1910)
Moma alpium (Osbeck, 1778)
Mormo maura (Linnaeus, 1758)
Mythimna riparia (Rambur, 1829)
Mythimna albipuncta (Denis & Schiffermuller, 1775)
Mythimna congrua (Hübner, 1817)
Mythimna ferrago (Fabricius, 1787)
Mythimna l-album (Linnaeus, 1767)
Mythimna languida (Walker, 1858)
Mythimna conigera (Denis & Schiffermuller, 1775)
Mythimna impura (Hübner, 1808)
Mythimna pallens (Linnaeus, 1758)
Mythimna pudorina (Denis & Schiffermuller, 1775)
Mythimna straminea (Treitschke, 1825)
Mythimna turca (Linnaeus, 1761)
Mythimna vitellina (Hübner, 1808)
Mythimna prominens (Walker, 1856)
Mythimna unipuncta (Haworth, 1809)
Mythimna andereggii (Boisduval, 1840)
Mythimna sicula (Treitschke, 1835)
Naenia typica (Linnaeus, 1758)
Noctua comes Hübner, 1813
Noctua fimbriata (Schreber, 1759)
Noctua interjecta Hübner, 1803
Noctua interposita (Hübner, 1790)
Noctua janthe (Borkhausen, 1792)
Noctua janthina Denis & Schiffermuller, 1775
Noctua orbona (Hufnagel, 1766)
Noctua pronuba (Linnaeus, 1758)
Noctua tertia Mentzer & al., 1991
Noctua tirrenica Biebinger, Speidel & Hanigk, 1983
Nonagria typhae (Thunberg, 1784)
Nyctobrya muralis (Forster, 1771)
Ochropleura leucogaster (Freyer, 1831)
Ochropleura plecta (Linnaeus, 1761)
Oligia dubia (Heydemann, 1942)
Oligia latruncula (Denis & Schiffermuller, 1775)
Oligia strigilis (Linnaeus, 1758)
Oligia versicolor (Borkhausen, 1792)
Olivenebula xanthochloris (Boisduval, 1840)
Omia banghaasi Stauder, 1930
Omia cyclopea (Graslin, 1837)
Omia cymbalariae (Hübner, 1809)
Omphalophana anatolica (Lederer, 1857)
Omphalophana antirrhinii (Hübner, 1803)
Omphalophana serrata (Treitschke, 1835)
Opigena polygona (Denis & Schiffermuller, 1775)
Orbona fragariae Vieweg, 1790
Oria musculosa (Hübner, 1808)
Orthosia gracilis (Denis & Schiffermuller, 1775)
Orthosia opima (Hübner, 1809)
Orthosia cerasi (Fabricius, 1775)
Orthosia cruda (Denis & Schiffermuller, 1775)
Orthosia miniosa (Denis & Schiffermuller, 1775)
Orthosia populeti (Fabricius, 1775)
Orthosia incerta (Hufnagel, 1766)
Orthosia gothica (Linnaeus, 1758)
Oxicesta chamoenices (Herrich-Schäffer, 1845)
Oxicesta geographica (Fabricius, 1787)
Pabulatrix pabulatricula (Brahm, 1791)
Pachetra sagittigera (Hufnagel, 1766)
Panchrysia aurea (Hübner, 1803)
Panchrysia v-argenteum (Esper, 1798)
Panemeria tenebrata (Scopoli, 1763)
Panolis flammea (Denis & Schiffermuller, 1775)
Panthea coenobita (Esper, 1785)
Papestra biren (Goeze, 1781)
Paradiarsia punicea (Hübner, 1803)
Parastichtis suspecta (Hübner, 1817)
Peridroma saucia (Hübner, 1808)
Perigrapha i-cinctum (Denis & Schiffermuller, 1775)
Perigrapha rorida Frivaldszky, 1835
Periphanes delphinii (Linnaeus, 1758)
Phlogophora meticulosa (Linnaeus, 1758)
Phlogophora scita (Hübner, 1790)
Photedes captiuncula (Treitschke, 1825)
Photedes fluxa (Hübner, 1809)
Photedes minima (Haworth, 1809)
Photedes morrisii (Dale, 1837)
Phragmatiphila nexa (Hübner, 1808)
Phyllophila obliterata (Rambur, 1833)
Plusia festucae (Linnaeus, 1758)
Plusia putnami (Grote, 1873)
Plusidia cheiranthi (Tauscher, 1809)
Polia bombycina (Hufnagel, 1766)
Polia hepatica (Clerck, 1759)
Polia nebulosa (Hufnagel, 1766)
Polia serratilinea Ochsenheimer, 1816
Polychrysia moneta (Fabricius, 1787)
Polymixis lichenea (Hübner, 1813)
Polymixis argillaceago (Hübner, 1822)
Polymixis dubia (Duponchel, 1836)
Polymixis flavicincta (Denis & Schiffermuller, 1775)
Polymixis polymita (Linnaeus, 1761)
Polymixis rufocincta (Geyer, 1828)
Polymixis serpentina (Treitschke, 1825)
Polymixis sublutea (Turati, 1909)
Polymixis xanthomista (Hübner, 1819)
Polyphaenis sericata (Esper, 1787)
Protolampra sobrina (Duponchel, 1843)
Protoschinia scutosa (Denis & Schiffermuller, 1775)
Pseudeustrotia candidula (Denis & Schiffermuller, 1775)
Pseudluperina pozzii (Curo, 1883)
Pseudozarba bipartita (Herrich-Schäffer, 1850)
Pyrrhia umbra (Hufnagel, 1766)
Rhizedra lutosa (Hübner, 1803)
Rhyacia helvetina (Boisduval, 1833)
Rhyacia lucipeta (Denis & Schiffermuller, 1775)
Rhyacia simulans (Hufnagel, 1766)
Rileyiana fovea (Treitschke, 1825)
Schinia cardui (Hübner, 1790)
Scotochrosta pulla (Denis & Schiffermuller, 1775)
Senta flammea (Curtis, 1828)
Sesamia cretica Lederer, 1857
Sesamia nonagrioides Lefebvre, 1827
Sideridis rivularis (Fabricius, 1775)
Sideridis kitti (Schawerda, 1914)
Sideridis reticulata (Goeze, 1781)
Sideridis lampra (Schawerda, 1913)
Sideridis turbida (Esper, 1790)
Simyra albovenosa (Goeze, 1781)
Simyra nervosa (Denis & Schiffermuller, 1775)
Spaelotis ravida (Denis & Schiffermuller, 1775)
Spaelotis senna (Freyer, 1829)
Spaelotis suecica (Aurivillius, 1890)
Spodoptera cilium Guenee, 1852
Spodoptera exigua (Hübner, 1808)
Spodoptera littoralis (Boisduval, 1833)
Standfussiana dalmata (Staudinger, 1901)
Standfussiana insulicola (Turati, 1919)
Standfussiana lucernea (Linnaeus, 1758)
Standfussiana wiskotti (Standfuss, 1888)
Staurophora celsia (Linnaeus, 1758)
Stilbia calberlae (Failla-Tedaldi, 1890)
Stilbia faillae Pungeler, 1918
Subacronicta megacephala (Denis & Schiffermuller, 1775)
Sympistis funebris (Hübner, 1809)
Sympistis nigrita (Boisduval, 1840)
Syngrapha ain (Hochenwarth, 1785)
Syngrapha devergens (Hübner, 1813)
Syngrapha hochenwarthi (Hochenwarth, 1785)
Syngrapha interrogationis (Linnaeus, 1758)
Synthymia fixa (Fabricius, 1787)
Teinoptera olivina (Herrich-Schäffer, 1852)
Thalpophila matura (Hufnagel, 1766)
Thalpophila vitalba (Freyer, 1834)
Tholera cespitis (Denis & Schiffermuller, 1775)
Tholera decimalis (Poda, 1761)
Thysanoplusia circumscripta (Freyer, 1831)
Thysanoplusia daubei (Boisduval, 1840)
Thysanoplusia orichalcea (Fabricius, 1775)
Tiliacea aurago (Denis & Schiffermuller, 1775)
Tiliacea citrago (Linnaeus, 1758)
Tiliacea cypreago (Hampson, 1906)
Tiliacea sulphurago (Denis & Schiffermuller, 1775)
Trachea atriplicis (Linnaeus, 1758)
Trichoplusia ni (Hübner, 1803)
Trichosea ludifica (Linnaeus, 1758)
Trigonophora flammea (Esper, 1785)
Tyta luctuosa (Denis & Schiffermuller, 1775)
Ulochlaena hirta (Hübner, 1813)
Valeria jaspidea (Villers, 1789)
Valeria oleagina (Denis & Schiffermuller, 1775)
Xanthia gilvago (Denis & Schiffermuller, 1775)
Xanthia icteritia (Hufnagel, 1766)
Xanthia ocellaris (Borkhausen, 1792)
Xanthia ruticilla (Esper, 1791)
Xanthia togata (Esper, 1788)
Xanthodes albago (Fabricius, 1794)
Xestia ashworthii (Doubleday, 1855)
Xestia c-nigrum (Linnaeus, 1758)
Xestia ditrapezium (Denis & Schiffermuller, 1775)
Xestia triangulum (Hufnagel, 1766)
Xestia alpicola (Zetterstedt, 1839)
Xestia rhaetica (Staudinger, 1871)
Xestia sincera (Herrich-Schäffer, 1851)
Xestia speciosa (Hübner, 1813)
Xestia viridescens (Turati, 1919)
Xestia agathina (Duponchel, 1827)
Xestia baja (Denis & Schiffermuller, 1775)
Xestia castanea (Esper, 1798)
Xestia cohaesa (Herrich-Schäffer, 1849)
Xestia collina (Boisduval, 1840)
Xestia jordani (Turati, 1912)
Xestia kermesina (Mabille, 1869)
Xestia ochreago (Hübner, 1809)
Xestia sexstrigata (Haworth, 1809)
Xestia stigmatica (Hübner, 1813)
Xestia xanthographa (Denis & Schiffermuller, 1775)
Xylena solidaginis (Hübner, 1803)
Xylena exsoleta (Linnaeus, 1758)
Xylena vetusta (Hübner, 1813)
Xylocampa areola (Esper, 1789)
Xylocampa mustapha (Oberthur, 1920)
Xylomoia stangelmaieri Mikkola, 1998

Nolidae
Bena bicolorana (Fuessly, 1775)
Earias albovenosana Oberthur, 1917
Earias clorana (Linnaeus, 1761)
Earias insulana (Boisduval, 1833)
Earias vernana (Fabricius, 1787)
Meganola albula (Denis & Schiffermuller, 1775)
Meganola strigula (Denis & Schiffermuller, 1775)
Meganola togatulalis (Hübner, 1796)
Nola aerugula (Hübner, 1793)
Nola chlamitulalis (Hübner, 1813)
Nola cicatricalis (Treitschke, 1835)
Nola confusalis (Herrich-Schäffer, 1847)
Nola cristatula (Hübner, 1793)
Nola cucullatella (Linnaeus, 1758)
Nola kruegeri (Turati, 1911)
Nola squalida Staudinger, 1871
Nola subchlamydula Staudinger, 1871
Nola thymula Milliere, 1867
Nycteola asiatica (Krulikovsky, 1904)
Nycteola columbana (Turner, 1925)
Nycteola degenerana (Hübner, 1799)
Nycteola revayana (Scopoli, 1772)
Nycteola siculana (Fuchs, 1899)
Pseudoips prasinana (Linnaeus, 1758)

Notodontidae
Cerura erminea (Esper, 1783)
Cerura vinula (Linnaeus, 1758)
Clostera anachoreta (Denis & Schiffermuller, 1775)
Clostera anastomosis (Linnaeus, 1758)
Clostera curtula (Linnaeus, 1758)
Clostera pigra (Hufnagel, 1766)
Dicranura ulmi (Denis & Schiffermuller, 1775)
Drymonia dodonaea (Denis & Schiffermuller, 1775)
Drymonia obliterata (Esper, 1785)
Drymonia querna (Denis & Schiffermuller, 1775)
Drymonia ruficornis (Hufnagel, 1766)
Drymonia velitaris (Hufnagel, 1766)
Furcula bicuspis (Borkhausen, 1790)
Furcula bifida (Brahm, 1787)
Furcula furcula (Clerck, 1759)
Gluphisia crenata (Esper, 1785)
Harpyia milhauseri (Fabricius, 1775)
Leucodonta bicoloria (Denis & Schiffermuller, 1775)
Notodonta dromedarius (Linnaeus, 1767)
Notodonta torva (Hübner, 1803)
Notodonta tritophus (Denis & Schiffermuller, 1775)
Notodonta ziczac (Linnaeus, 1758)
Odontosia carmelita (Esper, 1799)
Paradrymonia vittata (Staudinger, 1892)
Peridea anceps (Goeze, 1781)
Phalera bucephala (Linnaeus, 1758)
Phalera bucephaloides (Ochsenheimer, 1810)
Pheosia gnoma (Fabricius, 1776)
Pheosia tremula (Clerck, 1759)
Pterostoma palpina (Clerck, 1759)
Ptilodon capucina (Linnaeus, 1758)
Ptilodon cucullina (Denis & Schiffermuller, 1775)
Ptilophora plumigera (Denis & Schiffermuller, 1775)
Rhegmatophila richelloi Hartig, 1939
Spatalia argentina (Denis & Schiffermuller, 1775)
Stauropus fagi (Linnaeus, 1758)
Thaumetopoea pityocampa (Denis & Schiffermuller, 1775)
Thaumetopoea processionea (Linnaeus, 1758)

Oecophoridae
Alabonia geoffrella (Linnaeus, 1767)
Alabonia staintoniella (Zeller, 1850)
Aplota nigricans (Zeller, 1852)
Aplota palpella (Haworth, 1828)
Batia inexpectella Jackh, 1972
Batia internella Jackh, 1972
Batia lambdella (Donovan, 1793)
Batia lunaris (Haworth, 1828)
Bisigna procerella (Denis & Schiffermuller, 1775)
Borkhausenia fuscescens (Haworth, 1828)
Borkhausenia gelechiella (Wocke, 1889)
Borkhausenia luridicomella (Herrich-Schäffer, 1856)
Borkhausenia minutella (Linnaeus, 1758)
Borkhausenia venturellii Costantini, 1923
Crassa tinctella (Hübner, 1796)
Crassa unitella (Hübner, 1796)
Dasycera oliviella (Fabricius, 1794)
Denisia albimaculea (Haworth, 1828)
Denisia augustella (Hübner, 1796)
Denisia fuscicapitella Huemer, 2001
Denisia luctuosella (Duponchel, 1840)
Denisia muellerrutzi (Amsel, 1939)
Denisia nubilosella (Herrich-Schäffer, 1854)
Denisia ragonotella (Constant, 1885)
Denisia rhaetica (Frey, 1856)
Denisia similella (Hübner, 1796)
Denisia stipella (Linnaeus, 1758)
Endrosis sarcitrella (Linnaeus, 1758)
Epicallima formosella (Denis & Schiffermuller, 1775)
Esperia sulphurella (Fabricius, 1775)
Harpella forficella (Scopoli, 1763)
Herrichia excelsella Staudinger, 1871
Hofmannophila pseudospretella (Stainton, 1849)
Holoscolia huebneri Kocak, 1980
Metalampra cinnamomea (Zeller, 1839)
Metalampra italica Baldizzone, 1977
Minetia criella (Treitschke, 1835)
Minetia crinitus (Fabricius, 1798)
Minetia labiosella (Hübner, 1810)
Oecophora bractella (Linnaeus, 1758)
Pleurota marginella (Denis & Schiffermuller, 1775)
Pleurota aristella (Linnaeus, 1767)
Pleurota bicostella (Clerck, 1759)
Pleurota brevispinella (Zeller, 1847)
Pleurota contristatella Mann, 1867
Pleurota ericella (Duponchel, 1839)
Pleurota grisea Amsel, 1951
Pleurota planella (Staudinger, 1859)
Pleurota proteella Staudinger, 1880
Pleurota pungitiella Herrich-Schäffer, 1854
Pleurota pyropella (Denis & Schiffermuller, 1775)
Pleurota punctella (O. Costa, 1836)
Schiffermuelleria schaefferella (Linnaeus, 1758)
Schiffermuelleria grandis (Desvignes, 1842)

Opostegidae
Opostega salaciella (Treitschke, 1833)
Opostega spatulella Herrich-Schäffer, 1855
Opostegoides menthinella (Mann, 1855)
Pseudopostega crepusculella (Zeller, 1839)

Peleopodidae
Carcina quercana (Fabricius, 1775)

Plutellidae
Eidophasia messingiella (Fischer von Röslerstamm, 1840)
Eidophasia syenitella Herrich-Schäffer, 1854
Plutella xylostella (Linnaeus, 1758)
Plutella geniatella Zeller, 1839
Plutella porrectella (Linnaeus, 1758)
Rhigognostis annulatella (Curtis, 1832)
Rhigognostis hufnagelii (Zeller, 1839)
Rhigognostis incarnatella (Steudel, 1873)
Rhigognostis senilella (Zetterstedt, 1839)

Praydidae
Atemelia torquatella (Lienig & Zeller, 1846)
Prays citri (Milliere, 1873)
Prays fraxinella (Bjerkander, 1784)
Prays oleae (Bernard, 1788)

Prodoxidae
Lampronia aeripennella (Rebel, 1889)
Lampronia corticella (Linnaeus, 1758)
Lampronia flavimitrella (Hübner, 1817)
Lampronia luzella (Hübner, 1817)
Lampronia morosa Zeller, 1852
Lampronia provectella (Heyden, 1865)
Lampronia pubicornis (Haworth, 1828)
Lampronia rupella (Denis & Schiffermuller, 1775)
Lampronia standfussiella Zeller, 1852
Lampronia stangei Rebel, 1903

Psychidae
Acanthopsyche atra (Linnaeus, 1767)
Acanthopsyche ecksteini (Lederer, 1855)
Acanthopsyche zelleri (Mann, 1855)
Anaproutia comitella (Bruand, 1853)
Anaproutia raiblensis (Mann, 1870)
Anaproutia reticulatella (Bruand, 1853)
Apterona crenulella (Bruand, 1853)
Apterona helicinella (Herrich-Schäffer, 1846)
Apterona helicoidella (Vallot, 1827)
Apterona stauderi Wehrli, 1923
Bacotia claustrella (Bruand, 1845)
Bankesia conspurcatella (Zeller, 1850)
Bijugis apistella (Rebel, 1917)
Bijugis bombycella (Denis & Schiffermuller, 1775)
Bijugis pectinella (Denis & Schiffermuller, 1775)
Brevantennia adriatica (Rebel, 1919)
Brevantennia siederi (Sauter, 1954)
Brevantennia triglavensis (Rebel, 1919)
Canephora hirsuta (Poda, 1761)
Dahlica caspari Herrmann, 1984
Dahlica exulans Herrmann, 2000
Dahlica generosensis (Sauter, 1954)
Dahlica leoi (Dierl, 1970)
Dahlica lichenella (Linnaeus, 1761)
Dahlica marmorella Herrmann, 1988
Dahlica triquetrella (Hübner, 1813)
Diplodoma adspersella Heinemann, 1870
Diplodoma laichartingella Goeze, 1783
Epichnopterix alpina Heylaerts, 1900
Epichnopterix ardua (Mann, 1867)
Epichnopterix kovacsi Sieder, 1955
Epichnopterix montana Heylaerts, 1900
Epichnopterix plumella (Denis & Schiffermuller, 1775)
Epichnopterix pontbrillantella (Bruand, 1858)
Eumasia parietariella (Heydenreich, 1851)
Leptopterix dellabeffai (Hartig, 1936)
Leptopterix hirsutella (Denis & Schiffermuller, 1775)
Leptopterix plumistrella (Hübner, 1793)
Leptopterix turatii (Hartig, 1936)
Loebelia crassicornis (Staudinger, 1870)
Luffia ferchaultella (Stephens, 1850)
Luffia lapidella (Goeze, 1783)
Megalophanes turatii (Staudinger, 1877)
Megalophanes viciella (Denis & Schiffermuller, 1775)
Montanima karavankensis (Hofner, 1888)
Montanima venetiana Meier, 1964
Narycia duplicella (Goeze, 1783)
Oiketicoides febretta (Boyer de Fonscolombe, 1835)
Oiketicoides lutea (Staudinger, 1870)
Oiketicoides tedaldii (Heylaerts, 1881)
Oreopsyche tenella (Ad. Speyer, 1862)
Oreopsyche vorbrodtella (Wehrli, 1920)
Pachythelia villosella (Ochsenheimer, 1810)
Penestoglossa dardoinella (Milliere, 1863)
Phalacropterix apiformis (Rossi, 1790)
Phalacropterix graminifera (Fourcroy, 1785)
Phalacropterix graslinella (Boisduval, 1852)
Phalacropterix praecellens (Staudinger, 1870)
Postsolenobia juliella (Rebel, 1919)
Proutia betulina (Zeller, 1839)
Pseudobankesia alpestrella (Heinemann, 1870)
Pseudobankesia contractella Hattenschwiler, 1994
Psyche casta (Pallas, 1767)
Psyche crassiorella Bruand, 1851
Ptilocephala agrostidis (Schrank, 1802)
Ptilocephala albida (Esper, 1786)
Ptilocephala kahri (Lederer, 1857)
Ptilocephala muscella (Denis & Schiffermuller, 1775)
Ptilocephala plumifera (Ochsenheimer, 1810)
Ptilocephala pyrenaella (Herrich-Schäffer, 1852)
Ptilocephala sicheliella (Bruand, 1858)
Ptilocephala silphella (Milliere, 1871)
Ptilocephala vesubiella (Milliere, 1872)
Ptilocephala wockei (Standfuss, 1882)
Rebelia herrichiella Strand, 1912
Rebelia kruegeri Turati, 1914
Rebelia sapho (Milliere, 1864)
Rebelia surientella (Bruand, 1858)
Rebelia thomanni Rebel, 1937
Reisseronia hofmanni (Heylaerts, 1879)
Reisseronia muscaelutum Kurz, Kurz & Zeller-Lukashort, 2006
Reisseronia satanella Kurz, Kurz & Zeller-Lukashort, 2006
Reisseronia tarnierella (Bruand, 1851)
Sciopetris hartigi Sieder, 1976
Siederia apenninica Herrmann, 2000
Siederia kathrinella Herrmann, 2001
Siederia listerella (Linnaeus, 1758)
Siederia meierella (Sieder, 1956)
Sterrhopterix fusca (Haworth, 1809)
Sterrhopterix standfussi (Wocke, 1851)
Taleporia defoliella Constant, 1895
Taleporia politella (Ochsenheimer, 1816)
Taleporia tubulosa (Retzius, 1783)
Typhonia ciliaris (Ochsenheimer, 1810)

Pterolonchidae
Pterolonche pulverulenta Zeller, 1847
Pterolonche albescens Zeller, 1847
Pterolonche inspersa Staudinger, 1859

Pterophoridae
Adaina microdactyla (Hübner, 1813)
Agdistis adactyla (Hübner, 1819)
Agdistis bennetii (Curtis, 1833)
Agdistis frankeniae (Zeller, 1847)
Agdistis hartigi Arenberger, 1973
Agdistis heydeni (Zeller, 1852)
Agdistis melitensis Amsel, 1954
Agdistis meridionalis (Zeller, 1847)
Agdistis morini Huemer, 2001
Agdistis neglecta Arenberger, 1976
Agdistis paralia (Zeller, 1847)
Agdistis protai Arenberger, 1973
Agdistis satanas Milliere, 1875
Agdistis tamaricis (Zeller, 1847)
Amblyptilia acanthadactyla (Hübner, 1813)
Amblyptilia punctidactyla (Haworth, 1811)
Buszkoiana capnodactylus (Zeller, 1841)
Calyciphora acarnella (Walsingham, 1898)
Calyciphora adamas (Constant, 1895)
Calyciphora albodactylus (Fabricius, 1794)
Calyciphora nephelodactyla (Eversmann, 1844)
Capperia britanniodactylus (Gregson, 1867)
Capperia celeusi (Frey, 1886)
Capperia fusca (O. Hofmann, 1898)
Capperia hellenica Adamczewski, 1951
Capperia loranus (Fuchs, 1895)
Capperia maratonica Adamczewski, 1951
Capperia marginellus (Zeller, 1847)
Capperia polonica Adamczewski, 1951
Capperia trichodactyla (Denis & Schiffermuller, 1775)
Capperia zelleri Adamczewski, 1951
Cnaemidophorus rhododactyla (Denis & Schiffermuller, 1775)
Crombrugghia distans (Zeller, 1847)
Crombrugghia kollari (Stainton, 1851)
Crombrugghia laetus (Zeller, 1847)
Crombrugghia tristis (Zeller, 1841)
Emmelina argoteles (Meyrick, 1922)
Emmelina monodactyla (Linnaeus, 1758)
Geina didactyla (Linnaeus, 1758)
Gillmeria ochrodactyla (Denis & Schiffermuller, 1775)
Gillmeria pallidactyla (Haworth, 1811)
Gypsochares baptodactylus (Zeller, 1850)
Hellinsia carphodactyla (Hübner, 1813)
Hellinsia didactylites (Strom, 1783)
Hellinsia distinctus (Herrich-Schäffer, 1855)
Hellinsia inulae (Zeller, 1852)
Hellinsia inulaevorus (Gibeaux, 1989)
Hellinsia lienigianus (Zeller, 1852)
Hellinsia osteodactylus (Zeller, 1841)
Hellinsia pectodactylus (Staudinger, 1859)
Hellinsia tephradactyla (Hübner, 1813)
Marasmarcha fauna (Milliere, 1876)
Marasmarcha lunaedactyla (Haworth, 1811)
Marasmarcha oxydactylus (Staudinger, 1859)
Merrifieldia baliodactylus (Zeller, 1841)
Merrifieldia leucodactyla (Denis & Schiffermuller, 1775)
Merrifieldia malacodactylus (Zeller, 1847)
Merrifieldia semiodactylus (Mann, 1855)
Merrifieldia tridactyla (Linnaeus, 1758)
Oidaematophorus constanti Ragonot, 1875
Oidaematophorus giganteus (Mann, 1855)
Oidaematophorus lithodactyla (Treitschke, 1833)
Oidaematophorus rogenhoferi (Mann, 1871)
Oxyptilus chrysodactyla (Denis & Schiffermuller, 1775)
Oxyptilus ericetorum (Stainton, 1851)
Oxyptilus parvidactyla (Haworth, 1811)
Oxyptilus pilosellae (Zeller, 1841)
Paraplatyptilia metzneri (Zeller, 1841)
Platyptilia calodactyla (Denis & Schiffermuller, 1775)
Platyptilia farfarellus Zeller, 1867
Platyptilia gonodactyla (Denis & Schiffermuller, 1775)
Platyptilia nemoralis Zeller, 1841
Platyptilia tesseradactyla (Linnaeus, 1761)
Porrittia galactodactyla (Denis & Schiffermuller, 1775)
Procapperia maculatus (Constant, 1865)
Pselnophorus heterodactyla (Muller, 1764)
Pterophorus ischnodactyla (Treitschke, 1835)
Pterophorus pentadactyla (Linnaeus, 1758)
Puerphorus olbiadactylus (Milliere, 1859)
Stangeia siceliota (Zeller, 1847)
Stenoptilia annadactyla Sutter, 1988
Stenoptilia aridus (Zeller, 1847)
Stenoptilia bassii Arenberger, 2002
Stenoptilia bipunctidactyla (Scopoli, 1763)
Stenoptilia coprodactylus (Stainton, 1851)
Stenoptilia graphodactyla (Treitschke, 1833)
Stenoptilia gratiolae Gibeaux & Nel, 1990
Stenoptilia lutescens (Herrich-Schäffer, 1855)
Stenoptilia millieridactylus (Bruand, 1861)
Stenoptilia mimula Gibeaux, 1985
Stenoptilia pelidnodactyla (Stein, 1837)
Stenoptilia pneumonanthes (Buttner, 1880)
Stenoptilia pterodactyla (Linnaeus, 1761)
Stenoptilia stigmatodactylus (Zeller, 1852)
Stenoptilia zophodactylus (Duponchel, 1840)
Stenoptilodes taprobanes (Felder & Rogenhofer, 1875)
Tabulaephorus punctinervis (Constant, 1885)
Wheeleria obsoletus (Zeller, 1841)
Wheeleria spilodactylus (Curtis, 1827)

Pyralidae
Achroia grisella (Fabricius, 1794)
Acrobasis advenella (Zincken, 1818)
Acrobasis bithynella Zeller, 1848
Acrobasis centunculella (Mann, 1859)
Acrobasis consociella (Hübner, 1813)
Acrobasis dulcella (Zeller, 1848)
Acrobasis foroiuliensis Huemer & Nuss, 2007
Acrobasis getuliella (Zerny, 1914)
Acrobasis glaucella Staudinger, 1859
Acrobasis legatea (Haworth, 1811)
Acrobasis marmorea (Haworth, 1811)
Acrobasis obliqua (Zeller, 1847)
Acrobasis obtusella (Hübner, 1796)
Acrobasis porphyrella (Duponchel, 1836)
Acrobasis repandana (Fabricius, 1798)
Acrobasis romanella (Milliere, 1870)
Acrobasis sodalella Zeller, 1848
Acrobasis suavella (Zincken, 1818)
Acrobasis tumidana (Denis & Schiffermuller, 1775)
Aglossa caprealis (Hübner, 1809)
Aglossa pinguinalis (Linnaeus, 1758)
Aglossa signicostalis Staudinger, 1871
Alophia combustella (Herrich-Schäffer, 1855)
Amphithrix sublineatella (Staudinger, 1859)
Ancylosis cinnamomella (Duponchel, 1836)
Ancylosis imitella Hampson, 1901
Ancylosis oblitella (Zeller, 1848)
Ancylosis sareptalla (Herrich-Schäffer, 1861)
Anerastia incarnata Staudinger, 1879
Anerastia lotella (Hübner, 1813)
Aphomia sociella (Linnaeus, 1758)
Aphomia zelleri de Joannis, 1932
Apomyelois ceratoniae (Zeller, 1839)
Apomyelois ehrendorferi (Malicky & Roesler, 1970)
Asalebria florella (Mann, 1862)
Asalebria venustella (Ragonot, 1887)
Asarta aethiopella (Duponchel, 1837)
Assara terebrella (Zincken, 1818)
Bostra obsoletalis (Mann, 1884)
Bradyrrhoa cantenerella (Duponchel, 1837)
Bradyrrhoa confiniella Zeller, 1848
Bradyrrhoa gilveolella (Treitschke, 1832)
Bradyrrhoa luteola (La Harpe, 1860)
Bradyrrhoa trapezella (Duponchel, 1836)
Cadra abstersella (Zeller, 1847)
Cadra calidella (Guenee, 1845)
Cadra cautella (Walker, 1863)
Cadra figulilella (Gregson, 1871)
Cadra furcatella (Herrich-Schäffer, 1849)
Catastia marginea (Denis & Schiffermuller, 1775)
Corcyra cephalonica (Stainton, 1866)
Cremnophila sedakovella (Eversmann, 1851)
Cryptoblabes bistriga (Haworth, 1811)
Cryptoblabes gnidiella (Milliere, 1867)
Delplanqueia cortella (Constant, 1884)
Delplanqueia dilutella (Denis & Schiffermuller, 1775)
Denticera divisella (Duponchel, 1842)
Dioryctria abietella (Denis & Schiffermuller, 1775)
Dioryctria mendacella (Staudinger, 1859)
Dioryctria pineae (Staudinger, 1859)
Dioryctria robiniella (Milliere, 1865)
Dioryctria schuetzeella Fuchs, 1899
Dioryctria sylvestrella (Ratzeburg, 1840)
Eccopisa effractella Zeller, 1848
Elegia fallax (Staudinger, 1881)
Elegia similella (Zincken, 1818)
Ematheudes punctella (Treitschke, 1833)
Ematheudes tunesiella Ragonot, 1892
Endotricha flammealis (Denis & Schiffermuller, 1775)
Ephestia disparella Hampson, 1901
Ephestia elutella (Hübner, 1796)
Ephestia kuehniella Zeller, 1879
Ephestia unicolorella Staudinger, 1881
Ephestia welseriella (Zeller, 1848)
Epischnia adultella Zeller, 1848
Epischnia illotella Zeller, 1839
Epischnia leucoloma Herrich-Schäffer, 1849
Epischnia plumbella Ragonot, 1887
Epischnia prodromella (Hübner, 1799)
Episcythrastis tabidella (Mann, 1864)
Episcythrastis tetricella (Denis & Schiffermuller, 1775)
Etiella zinckenella (Treitschke, 1832)
Eucarphia vinetella (Fabricius, 1787)
Eurhodope cirrigerella (Zincken, 1818)
Eurhodope rosella (Scopoli, 1763)
Euzophera bigella (Zeller, 1848)
Euzophera cinerosella (Zeller, 1839)
Euzophera fuliginosella (Heinemann, 1865)
Euzophera lunulella (O. Costa, 1836)
Euzophera osseatella (Treitschke, 1832)
Euzophera pinguis (Haworth, 1811)
Euzopherodes lutisignella (Mann, 1869)
Euzopherodes vapidella (Mann, 1857)
Faveria dionysia (Zeller, 1846)
Fregenia prolai Hartig, 1947
Galleria mellonella (Linnaeus, 1758)
Glyptoteles leucacrinella Zeller, 1848
Gymnancyla canella (Denis & Schiffermuller, 1775)
Gymnancyla hornigii (Lederer, 1852)
Homoeosoma inustella Ragonot, 1884
Homoeosoma nebulella (Denis & Schiffermuller, 1775)
Homoeosoma nimbella (Duponchel, 1837)
Homoeosoma sinuella (Fabricius, 1794)
Hypochalcia ahenella (Denis & Schiffermuller, 1775)
Hypochalcia decorella (Hübner, 1810)
Hypochalcia lignella (Hübner, 1796)
Hypochalcia propinquella (Guenee, 1845)
Hypotia corticalis (Denis & Schiffermuller, 1775)
Hypotia infulalis Lederer, 1858
Hypotia pectinalis (Herrich-Schäffer, 1838)
Hypsopygia costalis (Fabricius, 1775)
Hypsopygia fulvocilialis (Duponchel, 1834)
Hypsopygia glaucinalis (Linnaeus, 1758)
Hypsopygia incarnatalis (Zeller, 1847)
Hypsopygia rubidalis (Denis & Schiffermuller, 1775)
Hypsotropa limbella Zeller, 1848
Hypsotropa vulneratella (Zeller, 1847)
Isauria dilucidella (Duponchel, 1836)
Khorassania compositella (Treitschke, 1835)
Lamoria anella (Denis & Schiffermuller, 1775)
Laodamia faecella (Zeller, 1839)
Lepidogma tamaricalis (Mann, 1873)
Loryma egregialis (Herrich-Schäffer, 1838)
Maradana fuscolimbalis (Ragonot, 1888)
Matilella fusca (Haworth, 1811)
Megasis rippertella (Zeller, 1839)
Merulempista cingillella (Zeller, 1846)
Merulempista turturella (Zeller, 1848)
Metallosticha argyrogrammos (Zeller, 1847)
Metallostichodes nigrocyanella (Constant, 1865)
Moitrelia italogallicella (Milliere, 1882)
Moitrelia obductella (Zeller, 1839)
Moitrelia thymiella (Zeller, 1846)
Myelois circumvoluta (Fourcroy, 1785)
Myelois cribratella Zeller, 1847
Myelois multiflorella Ragonot, 1887
Nephopterix angustella (Hübner, 1796)
Neurotomia coenulentella (Zeller, 1846)
Nyctegretis lineana (Scopoli, 1786)
Nyctegretis ruminella La Harpe, 1860
Nyctegretis triangulella Ragonot, 1901
Oncocera semirubella (Scopoli, 1763)
Ortholepis betulae (Goeze, 1778)
Oxybia transversella (Duponchel, 1836)
Paralipsa gularis (Zeller, 1877)
Pempelia albariella Zeller, 1839
Pempelia alpigenella (Duponchel, 1836)
Pempelia brephiella (Staudinger, 1879)
Pempelia genistella (Duponchel, 1836)
Pempelia palumbella (Denis & Schiffermuller, 1775)
Pempeliella matilella Leraut, 2001
Pempeliella ornatella (Denis & Schiffermuller, 1775)
Pempeliella sororiella Zeller, 1839
Phycita meliella (Mann, 1864)
Phycita metzneri (Zeller, 1846)
Phycita nephodeella Ragonot, 1887
Phycita poteriella (Zeller, 1846)
Phycita roborella (Denis & Schiffermuller, 1775)
Phycitodes albatella (Ragonot, 1887)
Phycitodes binaevella (Hübner, 1813)
Phycitodes inquinatella (Ragonot, 1887)
Phycitodes lacteella (Rothschild, 1915)
Phycitodes maritima (Tengstrom, 1848)
Phycitodes saxicola (Vaughan, 1870)
Pima boisduvaliella (Guenee, 1845)
Plodia interpunctella (Hübner, 1813)
Postemmalocera palaearctella (Turati, 1917)
Psorosa dahliella (Treitschke, 1832)
Psorosa lacteomarginata (A. Costa, 1888)
Psorosa mediterranella Amsel, 1953
Psorosa tergestella Ragonot, 1901
Pterothrixidia rufella (Duponchel, 1836)
Pyralestes ragusai Turati, 1922
Pyralis farinalis (Linnaeus, 1758)
Pyralis lienigialis (Zeller, 1843)
Pyralis regalis Denis & Schiffermuller, 1775
Raphimetopus ablutella (Zeller, 1839)
Rhodophaea formosa (Haworth, 1811)
Salebriopsis albicilla (Herrich-Schäffer, 1849)
Saluria maculivittella Ragonot, 1887
Sciota adelphella (Fischer v. Röslerstamm, 1836)
Sciota fumella (Eversmann, 1844)
Sciota hostilis (Stephens, 1834)
Sciota rhenella (Zincken, 1818)
Selagia argyrella (Denis & Schiffermuller, 1775)
Selagia spadicella (Hübner, 1796)
Seleucia pectinella (Chretien, 1911)
Stemmatophora borgialis (Duponchel, 1832)
Stemmatophora brunnealis (Treitschke, 1829)
Stemmatophora combustalis (Fischer v. Röslerstamm, 1842)
Synaphe antennalis (Fabricius, 1794)
Synaphe bombycalis (Denis & Schiffermuller, 1775)
Synaphe moldavica (Esper, 1794)
Synaphe morbidalis (Guenee, 1849)
Synaphe punctalis (Fabricius, 1775)
Trachonitis cristella (Denis & Schiffermuller, 1775)
Valdovecaria umbratella (Treitschke, 1832)
Vitula biviella (Zeller, 1848)
Zophodia grossulariella (Hübner, 1809)

See also
List of butterflies of Italy

External links
Fauna Europaea

Moths03
Italy03
Italy03